Matapalo Island is an island located in the region of Tumbes, Peru in the Pacific Ocean. It is separated from the mainland by a strait 198 – 273 m wide, in east-west orientation. With a total area of 6.08 km², it is the biggest of the Peruvian islands in the Gulf of Guayaquil.

Vegetation present in the island consists of mangrove forests, dry tropical forests and grasslands.

References 

Pacific islands of Peru